Load testing is the process of putting demand on a structure or system and measuring its response.

Software load testing

Physical load testing

Many types of machinery, engines, structures, and motors are load tested. The load may be at a designated safe working load (SWL), full load, or at an aggravated level of load. The governing contract, technical specification or test method contains the details of conducting the test. The purpose of a mechanical load test is to verify that all the component parts of a structure including materials, base-fixings are fit for task and loading it is designed for.

Several types of load testing are employed 
 Static testing is when a designated constant load is applied for a specified time. 
 Dynamic testing is when a variable or moving load is applied. 
 Cyclical testing consists of repeated loading and unloading for specified cycles, durations and conditions.

The Supply of Machinery (Safety) Regulation 1992 UK state that load testing is undertaken before the equipment is put into service for the first time. Performance testing applies a safe working load (SWL), or other specified load, for a designated time in a governing test method, specification, or contract. Under the Lifting Operations and Lifting Equipment Regulations 1998 UK load testing after the initial test is required if a major component is replaced, if the item is moved from one location to another or as dictated by the competent person.

Car charging system

A load test can be used to evaluate the health of a car's battery. The tester consists of a large resistor that has a resistance similar to a car's starter motor and a meter to read the battery's output voltage both in the unloaded and loaded state. When the tester is used, the battery's open circuit voltage is checked first. If the open circuit voltage is below spec (12.6 volts for a fully charged battery), the battery is charged first. After reading the battery's open circuit voltage, the load is applied. When applied, it draws approximately the same current the car's starter motor would draw during cranking. Based on the specified cold cranking amperes of the battery, if the voltage under load falls below a certain point, the battery is bad. Load tests are also used on running cars to check the output of the car's alternator.

See also
Internet Application Management
Soak testing
Stress testing
Structural testing
System testing
Web testing
Web server benchmarking

References

External links
 Modeling the Real World for Load Testing Web Sites by Steven Splaine
 What is Load Testing? by Tom Huston
 4 Types of Load Testing and when each should be used by David Buch
 Performance, Load, Stress or Endurance Test? Which do you want? by Chris Jones

Software testing
Quality assurance
Load testing tools
Tests